"" (A large city arises) is a German Catholic hymn, frequently sung for the consecration of churches (Kirchweihe) and their anniversaries. The text in three stanzas was written by Silja Walter and the melody was composed by Josef Anton Saladin in 1972. It became part of German Catholic hymnals Gotteslob.

History 
Silja Walter, who entered a Benedictine monastery in 1948, wrote "" in 1965.  composed the melody in 1972. It was included in the first Catholic hymnal in German, Gotteslob of 1975, as GL 642, and retained in the second edition as GL 479.

Theme 
The three stanzas of "" express praise, prayer and thanks. They refer to passages from Relevation 21, describing the New Jerusalem and Mother church. The stanzas have six lines each, rhyming AABCCB.

References

External links 
 

Catholic hymns in German
20th-century hymns in German
1972 songs